Charlott is the name of:

 Charlott Cordes (born 1988), German fashion model from Hamburg, Germany
 Charlott Da Silva (born 1986), Model of Venezuela
 Vivian Charlott Burkhardt (born 1986), Miss Grenada 2007
 Charlott Daudert (1913–1961), German film actress
 Charlott Strandberg (born 1962), Swedish revue-singer and actress

See also

Charlotta